Archain 1 is a protein that in humans is encoded by the ARCN1 gene.

Function

This gene maps in a region, which include the mixed lineage leukemia and Friend leukemia virus integration 1 genes, where multiple disease-associated chromosome translocations occur. It is an intracellular protein. Archain sequences are well conserved among eukaryotes and this protein may play a fundamental role in eukaryotic cell biology. It has similarities to heat shock proteins and clathrin-associated proteins, and may be involved in vesicle structure or vesicle trafficking.

References

Further reading